The 2011–12 season is the 86th campaign in the history of the French association football club Chamois Niortais. It is their second consecutive season in the Championnat National, the third tier of French football, after an 11th-place finish in 2010–11. Former Niort midfielder Pascal Gastien remained as manager, having been appointed to the position in 2009. Niort finished as runners-up in the Championnat National, thereby earning promotion to Ligue 2 for the 2012–13 season after a four-year absence from the second tier of French football.

Transfers

First-team appearances
 

|}

Championnat National
Niort began their season with a 2–1 home win against Gazélec Ajaccio thanks to goals from new signings Mustapha Durak and Jimmy Roye. The pair scored again in the following match, a 2–2 draw away at SR Colmar. The team continued their unbeaten start to the season with a 4–0 defeat of US Luzenac on 19 August 2011.

Match results
Key
In Result column, Niort score shown first
pen. = Penalty kick
o.g. = Own goal
Results

Coupe de France

References

External links
Chamois Niortais official website

Chamois Niortais F.C. seasons
Chamois Niortais